Middlesex College, formerly known as Middlesex County College, is a public community college with its main campus in Edison, New Jersey. Founded by the Middlesex County Board of Elected Freeholders in 1964, the two-year college serves the needs of Middlesex County, as well as surrounding communities. The college also maintains two urban center campuses, one located in the Civic Square government and theatre district of New Brunswick and one in the city center of Perth Amboy. The current president of Middlesex College is Mark McCormick, who succeeded Dr. Joann LaPerla-Morales.

The college is built on a portion of the former Raritan Arsenal, constructed in 1917 for the United States Army. The arsenal was closed in 1963, and in 1964, the county officially founded the college, naming Frank Chambers the first president to help design the new college. The school first opened its doors for classes in September 1966, with 1,500 students enrolled. In 2015, there were incidents of unexploded ordnance being found on campus suspected to be from the former arsenal.

Academics
The college offers more than 700 courses in 100 different degree and certificate programs with 21 specially designed transfer programs. The college has 206 full-time and 346 part-time faculty. The student-to-faculty ratio is 21:1. Full-time, part-time and online classes are available. Popular transfer colleges and universities include Rutgers University, College of New Jersey, Columbia University, Kean University, New Jersey Institute of Technology and New York University. Student activities include art exhibitions, athletics, campus radio, clubs and organizations, civic engagement, student newspaper and theatre. There are 85 computer labs with more than 1,750 computers.

Tuition for county residents is $103 per credit hour. Tuition for out of county residents is $206 per credit hour. Federal financial aid is available in the form of Pell grants, work study programs and direct loans. Students must complete their free application for FAFSA. The MCC Foundation offers over 100 scholarships for students attending the college.

Sports
Men's sports include soccer, basketball, wrestling, baseball, volleyball and track and field. Women's sports include soccer, softball, basketball, volleyball, and track and field. The Physical Education Center has a swimming pool, basketball courts, racquetball courts, and a dance studio. There is a weight training room with treadmills and stairmasters, which are available for students, faculty, and college alumni.

Child care
The college has a child care center for children ages 2–5 years old. Children are provided with breakfast, lunch and an afternoon snack at no additional charge. Classrooms are age-graded, with one qualified teacher and at least one assistant in each room, based on class size. Tuition is based on the child's age, and the number of days attended per week. Applicants for reduced fees must be full-time students, employed full-time, or participating in a job training program.

Notable alumni
 James M. Cahill, mayor of New Brunswick
 Joseph Danielsen (born 1965), politician who has represented the 17th Legislative District in the New Jersey General Assembly since 2014.
 Dave Meads (born 1964), former MLB relief pitcher who played for the Houston Astros.
 Jim Norton (born 1968), comedian, actor and radio personality
 Nancy Pinkin, politician who has served in the New Jersey General Assembly since 2014, where she represents the 18th Legislative District.
 Danny Pintauro (born 1976), actor from the TV show Who's the Boss attended and graduated from Middlesex County College
 Vincent Prieto (born 1960), politician, who served as the 170th Speaker of the New Jersey General Assembly, from 2014 to 2018.
 Ahmad Khan Rahami, suspect in the 2016 New York and New Jersey bombings (did not graduate)
 Tom Scharpling (born 1969), television writer and host of The Best Show radio program
 Robert J. Sexton, producer and director
 James Vallely (born 1954), television producer, and screenwriter, who was a writer and consulting producer for Arrested Development.
 Laurence S. Weiss (c. 1919–2003), politician who served in the New Jersey Senate from 1978 to 1992, where he represented the 19th Legislative District.
 Lily Yip, USA Olympian in table tennis

See also

 List of New Jersey County Colleges

References

External links
 Official website

Educational institutions established in 1964
Garden State Athletic Conference
Universities and colleges in Middlesex County, New Jersey
New Jersey County Colleges
1964 establishments in New Jersey
NJCAA athletics
Edison, New Jersey